Cyclotus is a genus of tropical land snails in the subfamily Cyclophorinae of the family Cyclophoridae.

Species

 Cyclotus amabili Fulton, 1905
 Cyclotus amboinensis (L. Pfeiffer, 1854)
 Cyclotus angulatus Martens, 1874
 Cyclotus approximans Heude, 1882
 Cyclotus atratus Ancey, 1890
 Cyclotus auriculatus Kobelt, 1884
 Cyclotus batchianensis L. Pfeiffer, 1861
 Cyclotus bemarahae Emberton, 2004
 Cyclotus bernsteini Martens, 1863
 Cyclotus biangulatus Martens, 1891
 Cyclotus birostris (L. Pfeiffer, 1855)
 Cyclotus bonensis P. Sarasin & F. Sarasin, 1899
 Cyclotus borealis (Möllendorff, 1885)
 Cyclotus bourguignati Doumet-Adanson, 1885
 Cyclotus boxalli Godwin-Austen, 1889
 Cyclotus buginensis P. Sarasin & F. Sarasin, 1899
 Cyclotus campanulatus Martens, 1865
 Cyclotus canaliculatus Möllendorff, 1895
 Cyclotus caroli Kobelt, 1884
 Cyclotus chinensis (L. Pfeiffer, 1855)
 Cyclotus cochinchinensis (L. Pfeiffer, 1857)
 Cyclotus confluens (L. Pfeiffer, 1860)
 Cyclotus conoideus Möllendorff, 1902
 Cyclotus cyclophoroides Möllendorff, 1890
 Cyclotus danieli (Morlet, 1886)
 Cyclotus daucinus (L. Pfeiffer, 1857)
 Cyclotus dautzenbergi (Sykes, 1902)
 Cyclotus difficillimus Schmacker & O. Boettger, 1890
 Cyclotus dimidiatus Kobelt, 1896
 Cyclotus discoideus (G. B. Sowerby I, 1843)
 Cyclotus discriminendus B. Rensch, 1934
 Cyclotus distomellus (G. B. Sowerby I, 1843)
 Cyclotus dohrni Kobelt, 1902
 Cyclotus euryomphalus (L. Pfeiffer, 1857)
 Cyclotus euzonus Dohrn, 1889
 Cyclotus fasciatus Martens, 1864
 Cyclotus floresianus Martens, 1891
 Cyclotus fooni Thach & F. Huber, 2021
 Cyclotus fortunei (L. Pfeiffer, 1854)
 Cyclotus fulminulatus Martens, 1865
 Cyclotus gallorum Emberton, 2004
 Cyclotus gassiesianus Crosse, 1867
 Cyclotus gordoni (Benson, 1863)
 Cyclotus griffithsi Emberton, 2004
 Cyclotus grohi (Thach & F. Huber, 2018) (taxon inquirendum)
 Cyclotus guttatus (L. Pfeiffer, 1853)
 Cyclotus gwendolenae (Godwin-Austen, 1889)
 Cyclotus hainanensis (H. Adams, 1870)
 Cyclotus hebraicus (Lesson, 1831)
 Cyclotus herzi O. Boettger, 1889
 Cyclotus huberi Thach, 2018
 Cyclotus hungerfordi (Godwin-Austen, 1889)
 Cyclotus iris (Godwin-Austen, 1889)
 Cyclotus jellesmae P. Sarasin & F. Sarasin, 1899
 Cyclotus kaimanaensis Dharma, 2021
 Cyclotus labuanensis (L. Pfeiffer, 1864)
 Cyclotus latruncularius P. Sarasin & F. Sarasin, 1899
 Cyclotus lepidotus Vermeulen, 1996
 Cyclotus leytensis Möllendorff, 1890
 Cyclotus lindstedti (L. Pfeiffer, 1857)
 Cyclotus lombockensis E. A. Smith, 1898
 Cyclotus longipilus Martens, 1865
 Cyclotus lowianus (L. Pfeiffer, 1864)
 Cyclotus macassaricus P. Sarasin & F. Sarasin, 1899
 Cyclotus mamillaris Odhner, 1919
 Cyclotus meyeri P. Sarasin & F. Sarasin, 1899
 Cyclotus microchilus (Crosse, 1868)
 Cyclotus micromamillaris Emberton, 2004
 Cyclotus mindaiensis (Bock, 1881)
 Cyclotus mindoricus Quadras & Möllendorff, 1896
 Cyclotus minor (Martens, 1872)
 Cyclotus namorokae Emberton, 2004
 Cyclotus natunensis E. A. Smith, 1894
 Cyclotus niasensis Fulton, 1907
 Cyclotus nigrispirus P. Sarasin & F. Sarasin, 1899
 Cyclotus novoguineensis Tapparone Canefri, 1883
 Cyclotus obscuratus B. Rensch, 1931
 Cyclotus palawanicus E. A. Smith, 1895
 Cyclotus pandarus P. Sarasin & F. Sarasin, 1899
 Cyclotus peramplus E. von Martens, 1903
 Cyclotus politus (G. B. Sowerby I, 1843)
 Cyclotus porrectus Möllendorff, 1898
 Cyclotus pruinosus Martens, 1863
 Cyclotus pseudoreticulatus Rensch, 1933
 Cyclotus pterocycloides (L. Pfeiffer, 1855)
 Cyclotus pulchellus (Morlet, 1889)
 Cyclotus pyrostoma E. A. Smith, 1896
 Cyclotus ranae B. Rensch, 1931
 Cyclotus reticulatus Martens, 1864
 Cyclotus schomburgianus Möllendorff, 1883
 Cyclotus semiliratus Möllendorff, 1896
 Cyclotus setosus (Möllendorff, 1894)
 Cyclotus siamensis (Martens, 1860)
 Cyclotus simonianus (Heude, 1886)
 Cyclotus simplicissimus B. Rensch, 1933
 Cyclotus smithi Kobelt, 1902
 Cyclotus solutus (Stoliczka, 1872)
 Cyclotus sontraensis Thach & F. Huber, 2020
 Cyclotus spiniferus (Morelet, 1861)
 Cyclotus stenomphalus Heude, 1882
 Cyclotus stoevi Thach & F. Huber, 2021
 Cyclotus subflammulatus L. Pfeiffer, 1861
 Cyclotus succinctus Martens, 1864
 Cyclotus sulcatus Möllendorff, 1890
 Cyclotus suluanus E. A. Smith, 1894
 Cyclotus sumatranus (Martens, 1864)
 Cyclotus taivanus H. Adams, 1870
 Cyclotus tener (Menke, 1856)
 Cyclotus tourannensis (Eydoux & Souleyet, 1852)
 Cyclotus trailli L. Pfeiffer, 1862
 Cyclotus trusanensis Godwin-Austen, 1889
 Cyclotus tubaeformis Möllendorff, 1882
 Cyclotus tubuliferus (L. Pfeiffer, 1854)
 Cyclotus variegatus Swainson, 1840
 Cyclotus vicinus E. A. Smith, 1896
 Cyclotus yeni Zilch, 1956

Synonyms
 Cyclotus (Opisthoporus) Benson, 1851: synonym of Opisthoporus Benson, 1851
 Cyclotus charmian Hutton, 1883: synonym of Gonatorhaphe fornicata (L. Pfeiffer, 1854)
 Cyclotus laevigatus F. Sandberger, 1870 †: synonym of Procyclotopsis laevigatus (F. Sandberger, 1870) † (new combination)
 Cyclotus scalaris Miller, 1907 †: synonym of Pomatias (Neobembridgia) arneggensis Wenz, 1923 † represented as Pomatias arneggensis Wenz, 1923 † (junior secondary homonym of Cyclostoma scalare Pfeiffer, 1851, later placed in Cyclotus)
 Cyclotus sieversi L. Pfeiffer, 1871: synonym of Caspicyclotus sieversi (L. Pfeiffer, 1871) (new combination)

References 

 Habe, T. (1965). Operculated land molluscs from South-East Asia. In: Nature and life in southeast Asia, vol 4, Fauna and Flora Research Society, Kyoto, Japan. pp. 111-128, 2 plates.
 Thach, N. N. (2018). New shells of South Asia. Seashells-Landsnails-Freshwater Shells. 3 New Genera, 132 New Species & Subspecies. 48HRBooks Company, Akron, Ohio, USA. 173 pp
 Thach, N. N. (2021). New shells of South Asia and Taiwan, China, Tanzania. Seashells*Freshwater*Land snails. With 116 new species and subspecies and rejected synonyms, accepted species. 48HRBooks Company, Akron, Ohio, USA. 202 pp.

External links 
 Möllendorff, O. F. von. (1890). Die Landschnecken-Fauna der Insel Cebu. Bericht über die Senckenbergische Naturforschende Gesellschaft in Frankfurt-am-Main. (1890): 189-292, pls 7-9.
 Möllendorff, O. F. von. (1900). Zur Binnenmollusken-Fauna von Annams III. Nachrichtsblatt der Deutschen Malakozoologischen Gesellschaft. 32 (7-8): 117-121 & 32 (9-10): 129-139
 Swainson, W. (1840). A treatise on malacology or shells and shell-fish. London, Longman. viii + 419 pp
 Kobelt W. (1902). Das Tierreich. Eine Zusammenstellung und Kennzeichnung der rezenten Tierformen. 16. Lieferung. Mollusca. Cyclophoridae. Das Tierreich. XXXIX + 662 pp., 1 map. [July. Berlin (R. Friedländer)]

 
 

Cyclophoridae
Gastropod genera